The Beverage antenna or "wave antenna" is a long-wire receiving antenna mainly used in the low frequency and medium frequency radio bands, invented by Harold H. Beverage in 1921.  It is used by amateur radio, shortwave listening, and longwave radio DXers and military applications.

A Beverage antenna consists of a horizontal wire from one-half to several wavelengths long (tens to hundreds of meters at HF to several kilometres for longwave) suspended above the ground, with the feedline to the receiver attached to one end, and the other end of the Beverage terminated through a resistor to ground. The antenna has a unidirectional radiation pattern with the main lobe of the pattern at a shallow angle into the sky off the resistor-terminated end, making it ideal for reception of long distance skywave (skip) transmissions from  stations over the horizon which reflect off the ionosphere. However the antenna must be built so the wire points in the direction of the transmitter(s) to be received. 

The advantages of the Beverage are excellent directivity, a wider bandwidth than resonant antennas, and a strong ability to receive distant and overseas transmitters.  Its disadvantages are its physical size, requiring considerable land area, and inability to rotate to change the direction of reception.  Installations often use multiple Beverage antennas to provide wide azimuth coverage.

History
Harold Beverage experimented with receiving antennas similar to the Beverage antenna in 1919 at the Otter Cliffs Radio Station. He discovered in 1920 that an otherwise nearly bidirectional long-wire antenna becomes unidirectional by placing it close to the lossy earth and by terminating one end of the wire with a resistor. In 1921, Beverage was granted a patent for his antenna.

Description

At the end toward the signal source it is terminated by a resistor to ground approximately equal in value to the characteristic impedance of the antenna considered as a transmission line, usually 400 to 800 Ω. At the other end it is connected to the receiver with a transmission line, through a balun to match the line to the antenna's characteristic impedance.

Operation
Unlike other wire antennas such as dipole or monopole antennas which act as resonators, with the radio currents traveling in both directions along the element, bouncing back and forth between the ends as standing waves, the Beverage antenna is a traveling wave antenna; the radio frequency current travels in one direction along the wire, in the same direction as the radio waves.  The lack of resonance gives it a wider bandwidth than resonant antennas.  It receives vertically polarized radio waves, but unlike other vertically polarized antennas it is suspended close to the ground, and requires some resistance in the ground to work.

The Beverage antenna relies on "wave tilt" for its operation. At low and medium frequencies, a vertically polarized radio frequency electromagnetic wave traveling close to the surface of the earth with finite ground conductivity sustains a loss that causes the wavefront to "tilt over" at an angle.  The electric field is not perpendicular to the ground but at an angle, producing an electric field component parallel to the Earth's surface. If a horizontal wire is suspended close to the Earth and approximately parallel to the wave's direction, the electric field generates an oscillating RF current wave traveling along the wire, propagating in the same direction as the wavefront.  The RF currents traveling along the wire add in phase and amplitude throughout the length of the wire, producing maximum signal strength at the far end of the antenna where the receiver is connected.

The antenna wire and the ground under it together can be thought of as a "leaky" transmission line which absorbs energy from the radio waves.   The velocity of the current waves in the antenna is less than the speed of light due to the ground.  The velocity of the wavefront along the wire  is also less than the speed of light due to its angle.   At a certain angle θmax the two velocities are equal.  At this angle the gain of the antenna is maximum, so the radiation pattern has a main lobe at this angle.  The angle of the main lobe is

where
 is the length of the antenna wire,
 is the wavelength.
The antenna has a unidirectional reception pattern, because RF signals arriving from the other direction, from the receiver end of the wire, induce currents propagating toward the terminated end, where they are absorbed by the terminating resistor.

Gain

While Beverage antennas have excellent directivity, because they are close to lossy Earth, they do not produce absolute gain; their gain is typically from −20 to −10 dBi.  This is rarely a problem, because the antenna is used at frequencies where there are high levels of atmospheric radio noise.  At these frequencies the atmospheric noise, and not receiver noise, determines the signal-to-noise ratio, so an inefficient antenna can be used.  The weak signal from the antenna can be amplified in the receiver without introducing significant noise.  The antenna is not used as a transmitting antenna since, to do so, would mean a large portion of the drive power is wasted in the terminating resistor

Directivity increases with the length of the antenna. While directivity begins to develop at a length of only 0.25 wavelength, directivity becomes more significant at one wavelength and improves steadily until the antenna reaches a length of about two wavelengths. In Beverages longer than two wavelengths, directivity does not increase because the currents in the antenna cannot remain in phase with the radio wave.

Implementation
A single-wire Beverage antenna is typically a single straight copper wire, between one-half and two wavelengths long, run parallel to the Earth's surface in the direction of the desired signal. The wire is suspended by insulated supports above the ground. A non-inductive resistor approximately equal to the characteristic impedance of the wire, about 400 to 600 Ω, is connected from the far end of the wire to a ground rod.  The other end of the wire is connected to the feedline to the receiver.

A dual-wire variant is sometimes utilized for rearward null steering or for bidirectional switching. The antenna can also be implemented as an array of 2 to 128 or more elements in broadside, endfire, and staggered configurations, offering significantly improved directivity otherwise very difficult to attain at these frequencies.  A four-element broadside/staggered Beverage array was used by AT&T at their longwave telephone receiver site in Houlton, Maine. Very large phased Beverage arrays of 64 elements or more have been implemented for receiving antennas for over-the-horizon radar systems.

The driving impedance of the antenna is equal to the characteristic impedance of the wire with respect to ground, somewhere between 400 and 800 Ω, depending on the height of the wire.  Typically a length of 50-ohm or 75-ohm coaxial cable would be used for connecting the receiver to the antenna endpoint. A matching transformer should be inserted between any such low-impedance transmission line and the higher 470-ohm impedance of the antenna.

See also
 Antenna (radio)
 Harold Beverage

Patents
 U.S. Patent 1,381,089 Jun 7, 1921 Radio Receiving System - the Beverage antenna
 U.S. Patent 1,434,984 Nov 7, 1922 Radio Receiving System - the bidirectional Beverage antenna
 U.S. Patent 1,434,985 Nov 7, 1922 Radio Receiving System - using a Beverage antenna with multiple receivers
 U.S. Patent 1,434,986 Nov 7, 1922 Radio Receiving System - a Beverage antenna with selective circuits to eliminate interference from adjacent wavelengths
 U.S. Patent 1,487,308 Mar 18, 1924 Radio Receiving System - improvements to the directivity of the Beverage Antenna
 U.S. Patent 1,556,122 Oct 6, 1925 Radio Receiving System - improvements to the directivity of the Beverage Antenna
 U.S. Patent 1,658,740 Feb 7, 1928 Radio Receiving System - broadside phasing of two of more Beverage antennas for improved directivity
 U.S. Patent 1,768,239 Reducing interference received through a sidelobe of a Beverage antenna
 U.S. Patent 1,816,614 Wave Antenna - improvements to the directivity of the Beverage Antenna
 U.S. Patent 1,821,402 Staggered Beverage antennas and phased staggered Beverage antennas

References

Sources
 Antenna Theory and Design by Warren L. Stutzman, Gary A. Thiele, John Wiley & Sons, May 22, 2012

Radio frequency antenna types
Antennas (radio)